Studénka is a town in Nový Jičín District in the Moravian-Silesian Region of the Czech Republic. It has about 9,300 inhabitants. The town is situated on both sides of the historical border between Moravia and Silesia.

Administrative parts

The town part of Butovice and the village of Nová Horka are administrative parts of Studénka.

Geography
Studénka is situated on both sides of the historical border between Moravia and Silesia; Butovice and Nová Horka lies in Moravia and the town proper in Silesia.

Studénka lies in the Moravian Gate on the left bank of the Oder River. Two sets of fish ponds are located in the municipal territory.

History
The first written mention of Studénka is from 1436. The village of Butovice was first mentioned in 1324 and Nová Horka in 1374. For centuries, Studénka was an agricultural village, and its population was Czech; Butovice was focused on cattle breeding and pond farming and had a predominantly German population.

In 1467–1569, Studénka was owned by the lords of Fulštejn, then it was owned by the Pražma of Bílkov family, who joined it to the Bílovec estate. After the Bohemian Revolt, the properties of the family were confiscated, and in 1634 the village was acquired by Václav of Vrbno, who joined it to the Fulnek estate. In the 18th century, Studénka was bought by the Mönnich family, and in the 19th century it was inherited by the Wahlstatt family.

In 1881 and 1890, the railway lines Studénka–Štramberk and Studénka–Bílovec were opened, and in 1900, a factory for the production of railway cars was established. The factory became the main employer in the region and contributed to the development of the village.

In 1959, until then an independent municipality Butovice was merged with Studénka and Studénka obtained the statute of a town.

Demographics

Economy
The traditional production of railway cars ended in 2006 and the Vagónka Studénka company was restructuralized. Since 2006, the factory has been a manufacturer of metal products known as MSV Metal Studénka.

Transport
Studénka lies on the international railway line between Kraków and Prague, and was the scene of the 2008 Studénka train wreck and the 2015 Studénka train crash.

Sport
SK Studénka is a Czech handball club which plays in the top tier. The football club MSV Studénka and ice hockey club HC Studénka play in the lower amateur tiers.

Sights

The Studénka Castle is formed by two Baroque buildings, known as Old Castle and New Castle. The Old Castle was built in 1705 and the New Castle in 1750. A tower was added in 1860–1863. Today the castle is used for cultural and commercial purposes and houses ceremonial hall, library, elementary art school, and Railway Cars Museum.

The most valuable sacral building is the parish Church of Saint Bartholomew. It was built in neo-Gothic style in 1880 on the site of an older wooden church from the early 16th century.

Notable people
Hugo Gorge (1883–1934), Austrian architect
František Tomášek (1899–1992), 34th archbishop of Prague
Martin Adamský (born 1981), ice hockey player
Vladimír Svačina (born 1987), ice hockey player

Twin towns – sister cities

Studénka is twinned with:
 Dąbrowa Górnicza, Poland

References

External links

Cities and towns in the Czech Republic
Populated places in Nový Jičín District